Agastache rugosa, also known as wrinkled giant hyssop, Korean mint, purple giant hyssop, Indian mint and Chinese patchouli is an aromatic herb in the mint family, native to East Asia (China, Japan, Korea, Russian Primorye, Taiwan, India, and Vietnam).

Description 

Some leaves have hair and/or touches of white on the underside. The leaves are slightly larger than anise hyssop.

They range in color from rose to violet. The stamens are didynamous, long, and exposed.

Cultivation 
A. rugosa grows well in fertile, moisture-retentive soils and good sunlight. The aroma becomes weaker in shady conditions.

The plant can be propagated by both sexual and asexual means. The seeds gathered in autumn can be sown in the spring.

Cultivars
There several cultivars, including 'Golden Jubilee', which has yellow-green foliage, 'Alabaster' and 'Fragrant Delight'.  There are also a number of giant hyssop hybrids with A. rugosa as a parent, such as Agastache × 'Black Adder' and 'Blue Fortune', a Royal Horticultural Society Award of Garden Merit winner.

Uses

Culinary

Korea 
The plant's Korean name is baechohyang, but it is more commonly known as banga in southern parts of Korea, where the herb is extensively cultivated and consumed. In southern Korean cuisine, the herb is a popular last minute addition to various dishes, such as chueo-tang (pond loach stew), and maeun-tang (spicy fish stew). It is also sometimes used as the main ingredient in buchimgae (Korean pancakes).

Medicinal

China 
It is called huòxiāng in Chinese and it is one of the 50 fundamental herbs used in traditional Chinese medicine. It is used interchangeably with guang huo xiang. It was traditionally used to relieve nausea, vomiting and poor appetite. It contains methyl chavicol, anethole, anisaldehyde, limonene, pinene and linalool.

Chemical constituents
Chemical compounds found in the plant include:

 Estragole,  plant
 p-Anisaldehyde, plant
 4-methoxycinnamaldehyde,  shoot
 Pachypodol, leaf
 Methylchavicol (60.01–88.43%),  
 d-Limonene
 Caryophyllene
 Hexadecanoic acid
 Linoleic acid
 Octahydro-7-methyl-methylene-4-(1-methylethyl)-1H-cyclopenta[1,3]cyclopropa[1,2]benzene

Notes

References

External links 
Photo
Plants For A Future
Medicinal Plant Images Database (School of Chinese Medicine, Hong Kong Baptist University)  

rugosa
Herbs
Korean vegetables
Namul
Plants used in traditional Chinese medicine